Omnibus is a 1992 French short comedy film directed by Sam Karmann. It won an Oscar in 1993 for Best Short Subject and it won the Short Film Palme d'Or at the 1992 Cannes Film Festival.

Cast
 Daniel Rialet - The Man
 Jacques Martial - The Conductor
 Christian Rauth - The Driver
 Jean-Chrétien Sibertin-Blanc
 Brigitte Auber

References

External links

1992 films
1992 comedy films
1992 short films
1990s French-language films
Live Action Short Film Academy Award winners
French independent films
Short Film Palme d'Or winners
French comedy short films
1990s French films